Pulteney is a surname.  Notable people with the surname include:

 Daniel Pulteney (c. 1684–1731), English government official and politician
 Harry Pulteney (1686–1767), English soldier and politician
 James Pulteney (1755 - 1811), Scottish soldier und British politician.
 Richard Pulteney (1730–1801), English botanist and physician
 William Pulteney (British Army officer) (1861–1941), British general in World War I
 William Pulteney, 1st Earl of Bath (1684–1764), British politician